L'Chayim, Comrade Stalin! is a 2002 documentary film directed by Yale Strom and narrated by Ron Perlman.

Overview
A documentary film on Joseph Stalin's creation of the Jewish Autonomous Oblast and its partial settlement by thousands of Russian and Yiddish-speaking Jews.

Awards 
In 2005 awarded bronze statuette of the Warsaw Phoenix at the Jewish Motifs International Film Festival in Warsaw, Poland.

References

External links

2002 films
Documentary films about historical events
American documentary films
Documentary films about Jews and Judaism
2000s English-language films
2000s American films